Antrodia is a genus of fungi in the family Fomitopsidaceae. Antrodia species have fruit bodies that typically resupinate (i.e., lying flat or spread out on the growing surface), with the hymenium exposed to the outside; the edges may be turned so as to form narrow brackets. Most species are found in temperate and boreal forests, and cause brown rot.

Description

Antrodia are effused-resupinate, that is, they lie stretched out on the growing surface with the hymenium exposed on the outer side, but turned out at the edges to form brackets. When present, these brackets are typically white or pale brown. The pores on the surface of the hymenium may be round or angular. The context is white or pale. All species cause brown-rot. Typically, basidiospores are thin-walled, cylindrical, and narrowly ellipsoidal or fusiform in shape. Most species grow on the wood of coniferous trees, except for A. albida, which grows on the dead wood of deciduous trees.

Phylogeny
In order to reliably identify the various species and strains of medicinal Antrodia, genetic markers have been developed and phylogenetic analyses performed. These analyses have demonstrated that there are three distinct phylogenetic lineages within the genus Antrodia.

Classification

The modern definition of the genus follows the description given by Gilbertson and Ryvarden (1986), in their monograph North American Polypores.

Distribution

Roughly twenty-nine species are known from Europe, 21 species in North America, and 18 species in East Asia, although more new species have been reported since the time of these publications.

Species

There are about 50 species in this genus:

Antrodia albida
Antrodia albidoides
Antrodia albobrunnea
Antrodia alpina
Antrodia aurantia
Antrodia bambusicola – China
Antrodia calceus
Antrodia carbonica
Antrodia cinnamomea
Antrodia conchata
Antrodia crassa
Antrodia daedaleiformis
Antrodia eutelea
Antrodia ferox
Antrodia gossypium
Antrodia heteromorpha
Antrodia hingganensis
Antrodia hippophaes
Antrodia huangshanensis
Antrodia hyalina – Russia
Antrodia infirma – Europe
Antrodia juniperina
Antrodia lalashana
Antrodia leucaena –China, Europe
Antrodia macra
Antrodia macrospora
Antrodia madronae – Western USA
Antrodia malicola
Antrodia mellita
Antrodia minuta
Antrodia monomitica – China
Antrodia multiformis – USA
Antrodia multipapillata
Antrodia novae-zelandiae
Antrodia oleracea
Antrodia parvula
Antrodia pictilis
Antrodia pini-cubensis
Antrodia plicata
Antrodia porothelioides
Antrodia pseudosinuosa
Antrodia pulverulenta
Antrodia pulvinascens
Antrodia ramentacea
Antrodia rhizomorpha
Antrodia rupamii
Antrodia sandaliae
Antrodia serialiformis
Antrodia serialis
Antrodia sinuosa
Antrodia sitchensis
Antrodia sordida
Antrodia stratosa
Antrodia subalbidoides
Antrodia submalicola
Antrodia subramentacea
Antrodia subxantha
Antrodia taxa
Antrodia tenerifensis – Tenerife
Antrodia terryi
Antrodia tropica – China
Antrodia uzbekistanica – Uzbekistan
Antrodia variiformis
Antrodia wangii
Antrodia xantha

References

External links

Fomitopsidaceae
Polyporales genera
Taxa named by Petter Adolf Karsten
Taxa described in 1879